The wedding of Princess Madeleine, Duchess of Hälsingland and Gästrikland, and the British-born American financier Christopher O'Neill took place in Stockholm on 8 June 2013.

Background 

Princess Madeleine is the second daughter and youngest child of King Carl XVI Gustaf and Queen Silvia of Sweden. As such, she is currently seventh in the line of succession to the throne. In 2009, she was engaged to marry the Swedish lawyer Jonas Bergström, with whom she had been in relationship since 2002. The wedding was set to take place in 2010, shortly after the June wedding of Princess Madeleine's elder sister and heir apparent to the throne, Crown Princess Victoria. In April 2010, however, the wedding was canceled and the engagement was broken off. Madeleine subsequently moved to New York City, where she met the British-born financier Christopher O’Neill. The first time they appeared in public as a couple was in January 2011. Their engagement was announced on 25 October 2012. The wedding was both publicly financed and paid by for by the king (who did not reveal how much he paid). The wedding cost an estimated 3 million kronor.

Ceremony 

The ceremony was held at the Royal Palace chapel in Stockholm on 8 June 2013. Lars-Göran Lönnermark, Chief Court Chaplain of the Royal Court and Bishop Emeritus of Skara, and Michael Bjerkhagen, Vicar of the Royal Court, conducted the ceremony. SVT, TV4 and TV4 News broadcast the wedding live throughout the entire day for Swedish viewers. Madeleine wore a wedding dress designed by Italian fashion designer Valentino Garavani. She wore a private tiara called modern fringe tiara. Madeleine was escorted halfway down the aisle by her father King Carl XVI Gustaf. She and Chris walked together for the other half.  At the left of the altar sat the crown of Hedvig Elisabeth Charlotte, Queen of Norway and Sweden, the same crown that was present at the baptismal font at Princess Madeleine's christening.

Wedding cake
The cake was made of 700 macarons stacked into a pyramid shape.

After the wedding

Princess Madeleine did not adopt the surname O'Neill and instead remained without a surname, allowing her to retain the style of Royal Highness. Christopher O'Neill also did not change his last name, unlike his brother-in-law Daniel, husband of Crown Princess Victoria.

In May 2013, the Marshal of the Realm Svante Lindqvist announced that O'Neill had asked not to be granted royal status and to remain a private citizen. O'Neill wished to retain his UK and US citizenships and his business as Head of Research at an investment firm in New York City, while relinquishing both the citizenships and business are necessary to become a member of the Swedish Royal Family. O'Neill therefore did not become Prince of Sweden or Duke of Hälsingland and Gästrikland. On the website of the Swedish Royal Court he was listed as a member of the royal family until the site was updated.

O'Neill is Roman Catholic and the couple intended to continue residing in New York immediately after their wedding (but later moved to London, England for a few years), but their children will have to be raised in Sweden and as Lutherans, like their mother, in order to have succession rights. On 7 October 2019 Madeleine's father the king issued a statement rescinding the royal status of her three children in an effort to more strictly associate Swedish royalty to the office of the head of state; they are still to be styled as princesses and prince, as well as duchesses and duke of their provinces, and they remain in the line of succession to the throne. Madeleine commented that her children now will have greater possibilities to format their own lives as private persons.

In August 2018, the Swedish Royal Court announced that the princess and her family were to move to Florida.

Guests

The Bride's paternal family
 The King and Queen, the bride's parents
The Crown Princess and Prince Daniel, Duke of Västergötland, the bride's sister and brother-in-law
Princess Estelle, Duchess of Östergötland, the bride's niece
 Prince Carl Philip, Duke of Värmland, the bride's brother
 Princess Margaretha, Mrs Ambler, the bride's paternal aunt
 Princess Birgitta and Prince Johann Georg of Hohenzollern, the bride's paternal aunt and uncle
 Prince Carl Christian and Princess Nicole of Hohenzollern, the bride's first cousin and his wife
 Prince Nicolas of Hohenzollern, the bride's first cousin, once removed
 Princess Désirée, Baroness Silfverschiöld and Baron Niclas Silfverschiöld, the bride's paternal aunt and uncle
 Princess Christina, Mrs. Magnuson and Mr Tord Magnuson, the bride's paternal aunt and uncle
 Marianne Bernadotte, the bride's paternal grandaunt by marriage
 Gunnila Bernadotte, the bride's paternal grandaunt by marriage

The Bride's maternal family
 Ralf de Toledo Sommerlath and Mrs Charlotte de Toledo Sommerlath, the bride's maternal uncle and aunt
 Carmita Sommerlath Baudinet and Mr Pierre Baudinet, the bride's cousin and her husband
 Thomas de Toledo Sommerlath and Ms Bettina Aussems, the bride's cousin and his partner
 Tim de Toledo Sommerlath and Ms Kristina Junghans, the bride's cousin, once removed and his partner
 Philip de Toledo Sommerlath, the bride's cousin, once removed
 Giulia de Toledo Sommerlath, the bride's cousin, once removed
 Walther L. Sommerlath and Mrs Ingrid Sommerlath, the bride's maternal uncle and aunt
 Patrick Sommerlath and Mrs Maline Sommerlath, the bride's cousin and his wife
 Leopold Lundén Sommerlath, the bride's cousin, once removed
 Chloé Sommerlath, bridesmaid, the bride's cousin, once removed
 Anaïs Sommerlath, bridesmaid, the bride's cousin, once removed
 Helena Christina Sommerlath, the bride's cousin
 Vivien Nadine Sommerlath, the bride's cousin

The Groom's family
 Eva Maria O'Neill, the groom's mother
 Annalisa O'Neill, the groom's half-sister
 Karen O'Neill, the groom's half-sister
 Stefanie O'Neill, the groom's half-sister
 Tatjana d'Abo and Henry d'Abo, the groom's half-sister and her husband
 Anouska d'Abo, the groom's niece
 Celina d'Abo, the groom's niece
 Jasper d'Abo, pageboy, the groom's nephew
 Countess Natascha von Abensberg-Traun and Count Ernst von Abensberg-Traun, the groom's half-sister and her husband
 Countess Milana von Abensberg-Traun, the groom's niece
 Count Moritz von Abensberg-Traun, the groom's nephew
 Countess Chiara von Abensberg-Traun, bridesmaid, the groom's niece
 Count Louis Cajetan von Abensberg-Traun, pageboy, the groom's nephew

Foreign Royalty
The following members of foreign royal families attended the wedding:

Members of reigning royal families

  The Crown Prince and Crown Princess of Denmark (representing the Queen of Denmark)
  Prince Joachim and Princess Marie of Denmark
  Princess Benedikte of Denmark (Princess Madeleine's godmother)
  The Princess Takamado (representing the Emperor of Japan)
  The Princess of Monaco (representing the Prince of Monaco)
  The Crown Prince and Crown Princess of Norway (representing the King of Norway)
  Princess Märtha Louise of Norway and Ari Behn
  The Earl and Countess of Wessex (representing the Queen of the United Kingdom and Commonwealth Realms)
  The Hereditary Grand Duke and Hereditary Grand Duchess of Luxembourg (representing the Grand Duke of Luxembourg)

Members of non-reigning royal families
 Prince Leopold and Princess Ursula of Bavaria
 Prince Manuel and Princess Anna of Bavaria
 Crown Prince Pavlos and Crown Princess Marie-Chantal of Greece
 Prince Nikolaos and Princess Tatiana of Greece and Denmark
 Princess Theodora of Greece and Denmark
 Prince Philippos of Greece and Denmark
 The Prince of Saxe-Coburg and Gotha
 The Hereditary Prince and Hereditary Princess of Saxe-Coburg and Gotha
 Maharana Arvind Singh Mewar of Udaipur

Wedding attendants  
 Chloé Sommerlath (bridesmaid)
 Anaïs Sommerlath (bridesmaid)
 Lillie von Horn (bridesmaid)
 Countess Chiara Abensperg und Traun (bridesmaid)
 Jasper d'Abo (pageboy)
 Count Louis Cajetan Abensperg und Traun (pageboy)
 Cedric Notz (best man)

See also
The Swedish Royal Family's jewelry
Wedding of Victoria, Crown Princess of Sweden, and Daniel Westling
Wedding of Prince Carl Philip and Sofia Hellqvist

References

External links 

Official information about the wedding

2013 in Sweden
Marriage, unions and partnerships in Sweden
Swedish royal weddings
2010s in Stockholm
June 2013 events in Europe
Madeleine and Christopher O'Neill